António Mendes Correia (1888 - 1960) was a Portuguese anthropologist, physician and scientist. He is known for his "Australian theory" that argues about Australian natives migrating to America by sea through the Antarctic, explaining the human settlements found in Tierra del Fuego part of the Argentine  Patagonia and the southernmost island closer to the continent, which also explain other settlement around south America that support a pre-clovis theory.

1888 births
1960 deaths
Portuguese anthropologists
Portuguese scientists
Mayors of Porto
20th-century Portuguese physicians
University of Porto alumni
20th-century anthropologists